GetJar is an independent mobile phone app store founded in Lithuania in 2004, with offices in Vilnius, Lithuania and San Mateo, California
.

History 
The company was founded by Ilja Laurs in 2004, who is currently its Executive Chairman and Chris Dury is the CEO. Accel Partners and Tiger Global Management are among the investors.

GetJar was started by developers for developers in 2004 as an app beta testing platform. The platform started making free apps available in early 2005. 

In February 2014, GetJar was acquired by Sungy Mobile. Sungy is based in China and is said to have paid over $5 million in cash and the then market value of $35 million in Sungy stocks.

As of early 2015, the company provides more than 849,036 mobile apps across major mobile platforms including Java ME, BlackBerry, Symbian, Windows Mobile and Android and has over 3 million downloads per day. GetJar allows software developers to upload their applications for free through a developer portal. In June 2010, about 300,000 software developers added apps to GetJar resulting in over one billion downloads. In July 2011, GetJar had over two billion downloads.

GetJar has been known to host many apps in the past that were compromised with viruses, such as Android:Plankton [PUP].

See also
 List of digital distribution platforms for mobile devices

References

External links
 Official website (Mobile)
 

Mobile software distribution platforms
Android (operating system) software
Lithuanian brands
Internet properties established in 2004
Companies based in Vilnius
Lithuanian companies established in 2004